Craigieburn Phoenix Rugby League Club was an Australian rugby league football club based in Craigieburn, Victoria established in 2008. Now (since 2016) known as Hume City Bulldogs they conduct teams for both junior, senior and women tag teams.

See also

Victorian Rugby League
Rugby League in Victoria

External links
 
Craigieburn Phoenix Fox Sports pulse
 

Rugby league clubs in Melbourne
Defunct rugby league teams in Australia
Rugby clubs established in 2008
2008 establishments in Australia
Sports clubs disestablished in 2016
2016 disestablishments in Australia
Sport in the City of Hume